The Falster Foot Regiment was a Royal Danish Army infantry regiment. On 1 August 1976 it was amalgamated into the Danish Life Regiment, where four out of five battalions continued to exist until 1981.

History
The Falsterske Fodregiment can trace its history back to 1747. The regiment was garrisoned in Copenhagen until 1758, then in Rendsburg, to return to Copenhagen in 1763. In 1779 the regiment moved to Aalborg, as the rank and file primarily came from Nørrejylland. It stayed here till 1816, then for a brief time relocated to Copenhagen, to return to Aalborg again in 1820. The Regiment remained in Aalborg until 1913, whence it relocated to Roskilde and from 1 November 1951 to Vordingborg.

The Regiment has participated in the wars, Slaget på Reden (1801), Gunboat War (1807–1814), First Schleswig War (1848–1850) and Second Schleswig War (1864).

The regimental flag has the battle honours Bov 1848, Slesvig 1848, Isted 1850 and Sankelmark 1864.

Organisation
Disband units 
  1st battalion (I/FAFR), Mechanized infantry Battalion.(1961–1981)   
  2nd battalion (II/FAFR), Infantry Battalion. (1961–1981)    
  3rd battalion (III/FAFR), Infantry Battalion. (1961–1981)         
  4th battalion (IV/FAFR), Infantry Battalion. (1961–1981)
  5th battalion (V/FAFR), Infantry Battalion. (1961–1976)
  5th Brigade Staff Company/2nd Zealand Brigade. (1961–1976)
  Falster Regiment of Foot Music Corps, (1961–1976)

Names of the regiment

Standards

References
 Lærebog for Hærens Menige, Hærkommandoen, March 1960

Danish Army regiments
Military units and formations established in 1747